Oingo Boingo was an American new wave band.

Oingo Boingo may also refer to:

Oingo Boingo (EP), the second official release from the group with the same name
Oingo and Boingo, fictional characters from the Japanese manga series JoJo's Bizarre Adventure